San Francisco del Monte, also referred to as SFDM, is a district of Quezon City, Metro Manila, the Philippines. It is bisected by two major thoroughfares, Fernando Poe Jr. Avenue and the eponymous Del Monte Avenue, and is bounded by Atty. Pat Senador Sr. Street and Baler Street to the north, and Judge Juan Luna Street, Paraiso Street, and Cooper Street to the east.

The district encompasses the barangays of Del Monte, Damayan, Mariblo, and Paraiso, and its water borders are defined by the San Juan River to the west and the Mariblo Creek to the south.

History 
San Francisco del Monte may be considered as Quezon City's oldest district. It was founded as a pueblo by then-Franciscan missionary Fray Pedro Bautista on February 17, 1590, who named it after St. Francis of Assisi, founder of the Franciscan Order. Del Monte, which is Spanish for "on the mountain" was added to the name not only because the area was hilly, but also to distinguish the place from the San Francisco de Manila Church in Intramuros, Manila.

After World War II, the portions of the district hosted the United States Armed Forces Cemetery #2, where remains of deceased American POWs from the early part of the war were interred.

It was previously part of the town of San Juan del Monte until it was absorbed by Quezon City. It later composed of barangays San Antonio, Paraiso, Paltok, Mariblo, Masambong, Manresa, Damayan and Del Monte. It featured a hilly topography with lush vegetation and mineral springs, in the midst of which the old San Pedro Bautista Church was built as a retreat and monastery for Franciscan friars.

Today, it is a heavily populated district with a mix of residential, industrial, and commercial areas. The most prominent educational institutions located in the area are Siena College of Quezon City, Angelicum College, and PMI Colleges, while Fisher Mall is the largest commercial establishment. The transmitter and studios of IBC are located along Fernando Poe Jr. Avenue.

Famous residents include the late Filipino actor Fernando Poe, Jr. whose ancestral home can still be found in Barangay Paraiso along Roosevelt Avenue; the aforementioned avenue would be later renamed after him in 2022.

References 

Quezon City
Populated places established in 1590